Breamfield is a hamlet in Derbyshire, England. It is located 1 mile south-east of Wirksworth.

Hamlets in Derbyshire
Derbyshire Dales